Lee Eunae is a South Korean judge. She was named a Justice of the Constitutional Court of Korea in 2018.

Career 
1987       29th National Bar Exam
1990       Judge, Western Branch of Seoul District Court
1992       Judge, Seoul Civil District Court 
1994       Judge, Gwangju District Court
1999       Judge, Southern Branch of Seoul District Court
1999       UC Berkeley (overseas training)
2000       Judge, Northern Branch of Seoul District Court
2002       Rapporteur Judge, Constitutional Court of Korea
2005       Senior Judge, Incheon District Court
2008       Senior Judge, Eastern Branch of Seoul District Court
2010       Senior Judge, Seoul Central District Court
2012       Senior Judge, Jeonju Branch of Gwangju High Court
2014       Senior Judge, Seoul High Court
2017       (Acting) Chief Senior Judge, Seoul Family Court
2018~      Justice, Constitutional Court (Since September 21, 2018)

References 

1966 births
Living people
Justices of the Constitutional Court of Korea
South Korean judges
South Korean women judges
Constitutional court women judges
Seoul National University School of Law alumni